| taxon = Colossoemys
| authority = Rodrigues, 1892
| subdivision_ranks = Species
| subdivision=
 C. macrococcygeana Rodrigues, 1892 (type)
}}

Colossoemys is the nomen dubium of an extinct genus of alligatoroid crocodilian. Based on fossils found in the Solimões Formation, the finds were assigned to Emys macrococcygeanus, a turtle that would have inhabited the Amazon Basin South America during the Pleistocene epoch. The genus was originally named on the basis of two large procoelous vertebrae, a pubis, and a plastral fragment (likely to be from a turtle rather than a crocodilian). The paucity of material associated with the genus has led Colossoemys to be considered a nomen dubium.

References

Bibliography 
 

Pleistocene crocodylomorphs
Quaternary reptiles of South America
Neogene Brazil
Fossils of Brazil
Fossil taxa described in 1892
Nomina dubia